The strigil (probably a loanword from Pre-Greek substrate) is a tool for the cleansing of the body by scraping off dirt, perspiration, and oil that was applied before bathing in Ancient Greek and Roman cultures. In these cultures the strigil was primarily used by men, specifically male athletes; however, in Etruscan culture there is some evidence of strigils being used by both sexes. The standard design is a curved blade with a handle, all of which is made of metal.

Strigils were commonly used by individuals who were engaging in vigorous activities, in which they accumulated large amounts of dirt and sweat on their bodies.  The people who used the strigil included athletes, the wealthy, soldiers, and more. However, wealthy or prestigious individuals often had slaves to wield the strigils and clean their bodies, rather than doing it themselves.

Strigils were not only significant in a practical sense, but culturally as well. They are often found in tombs or burials, in some cases along with a bottle of oil.

Representations

Timeline
Strigils were not used in the earlier ages of Greek history. This is supported by Homer’s poems, which state that oil was applied after bathing and was not removed. Furthermore, strigils are not mentioned in literature until the later portion of the fifth century BC. As early as the sixth century BC, however, representations of strigils can be found on vases.  By the fourth century BC, strigils are depicted in other types of artwork, such as skyphoi and statues.

Cultural depictions
As stated above, strigils are represented throughout Greek, Roman, and Etruscan cultures in varying ways. Strigils were often depicted alongside olive oil and an athlete. The Croatian Apoxyomenos is a statue that displays the use of a strigil by an athlete. Strigils were also represented on some sarcophagi, such as the marble strigil sarcophagus of a Greek physician, which has elaborate S-shaped curves on it to symbolize strigils.

One source offers an alternative portrayal of strigils, “a secondary meaning for the word stlengis, strigil, is wreath or tiara.” To support the claim that a strigil may have been viewed as a tiara or wreath, there was a fifth-century grave that had a strigil across the forehead of a corpse.

Burials and tombs

Strigils were significant beyond merely being tools for cleansing; they were also a common offering given to the deceased during burial. For instance, three graves from Greece in the third century BC, which contained adult males, all had iron strigils.  

In the excavation of another third century BC tomb, which contained an Etruscan woman, there was an inscribed silver strigil along with a mirror. Strigils were commonly found in the tombs of Etruscan women, and it seemed to be an essential part of women’s bathing equipment. The inscribed silver strigil of the Etruscan tomb has two inscriptions on the handle: One being śuthina, an inscription found on numerous objects in the tomb. While the other, more significant inscription is a monogram, R:M, which reads as Ra:Mu. The monogram is speculated to be the beginning of the Etruscan woman’s name.

A strigil was found during excavations in the cemetery area at Teos.

In 2018, archaeologists discovered in Assos many strigils. Some of the strigils found were iron, but most were made of bronze.

Composition and design
As is obvious from the strigils found in the previously discussed tombs, strigils could differ in the type of metal used, design, etc., depending on the status of the individual it belonged to, time period, and other relevant factors. The typical metals used for strigils were bronze and iron.
Some other variations of strigils are as follows: Hippias, an ancient Greek sophist who created his own strigil, made it in a unique way which allowed for sweat to drain through a small channel. Literature from Plutarch states that Spartans used reeds at times instead of the typical metal strigils.

Gallery

See also
Gymnasium (ancient Greece)
Roman bath
Oil cleansing method
Gua sha

References

External links

Cleaning tools
Sport in ancient Greece
Sport in ancient Rome
Ancient Roman tools